John Warner (1898 – 23 August 1950) was an English professional association footballer who played as an inside forward.

References

1898 births
1950 deaths
Footballers from Woolwich
English footballers
Association football forwards
Burnley F.C. players
Manchester City F.C. players
Watford F.C. players
Thames A.F.C. players
English Football League players